Thong is a hamlet southeast of Gravesend in Kent, England. The population of the hamlet is included in the civil parish of Shorne.

It has frequently been noted on lists of unusual place names and appeared as a question answer for Round Britain Quiz on BBC Radio 4.

The name 'Thong' is first attested in the Registrum Roffense of circa 1200, where it appears as Thuange. The name may correspond with the Middle Low German dwenge meaning 'trap', but this cannot be confirmed.

References

Hamlets in Kent